The many-spotted dichomeris moth (Dichomeris punctipennella) is a moth of the family Gelechiidae. It is found in the United States, including Alabama, Maine, Maryland, Massachusetts, New Hampshire, Tennessee, Texas and Virginia.

References

Moths described in 1860
punctipennella